Paul Joseph McMahon (born 12 March 1983) is an English cricketer. He is a right-handed batsman and a right-arm offbreak bowler.

McMahon has represented Nottinghamshire in first-class cricket since 2002. Between 2002 and 2005, he also studied for a law degree at Oxford University, captaining the University cricket team in his last two years.

McMahon was educated at The Trinity School, Nottingham and was the England Under-19s captain in the 2002 series against India.

References

External links
Paul McMahon at Cricket Archive
Paul McMahon at Cricinfo

1983 births
Living people
English cricketers
Nottinghamshire cricketers
Alumni of Wadham College, Oxford
Oxford University cricketers
Oxfordshire cricketers
Cambridgeshire cricketers
People educated at The Trinity School, Nottingham
British Universities cricketers
English cricketers of the 21st century
Place of birth missing (living people)
Oxford MCCU cricketers